"Beast" is the debut single by British rapper Chipmunk, released in December 2008. It is the first single taken from his debut studio album, I Am Chipmunk. It was released on the Alwayz Recordings label. The music video for "Beast" was uploaded to the Alwayz Recordings YouTube account on 8 November 2008. The "Beast" video was directed by Mo. The video is presented in black and white with Loick Essien making a guest appearance throughout.

Track listing
 CD single
 "Beast" - 3:56
 "Beast" (Bassline Remix) - 4:40
 "Beast" (Grime Remix) (featuring Loick Essien, Wretch 32 & Bashy) - 3:56
 "Hit Maker" (featuring Stylo G) - 3:33

Charts

Release history

References

2008 singles
Chipmunk (rapper) songs
2008 songs
Songs written by Chip (rapper)
Songs written by Talay Riley